Sagkeeng Hawks were a junior "B" ice hockey team based in Fort Alexander, Manitoba, Canada, and members of the Keystone Junior Hockey League (KJHL).

External links
Official website

Defunct ice hockey teams in Manitoba

Sagkeeng First Nation